The Jebel Qatrani Formation (also Gebel Qatrani) is a palaeontological and geologic formation located  in the Faiyum Governorate of central Egypt.

Conformably overlying the Qasr el Sagha Formation. It is exposed namely between the Jebel Qatrani escarpment and the Qasr el Sagha escarpment, north of Birket Qarun lake near Faiyum.

Geology
These rocks were laid down in the Eocene-Oligocene period (Priabonian - Rupelian).  This formation was originally thought to be between 35.4 and 33.3 million years old, based on initial analysis of the formation. However, analysis by Erik Seiffert in 2006 concluded that the age of the Jebel Qatrani Formation should be revised. His assessment of more recent evidence indicates an age for most of the formation of between 30.2 and 29.5 million years ago, placing it almost entirely in the Early Oligocene. Seiffert states that only the lowest 48 metres was laid down in the Eocene, but recent opinion holds the original hypothesis of a sediment straddling the Eocene-Oligocene boundary to be correct.

Mostly sandstones deposited by meandering rivers and seasonal lakes, the lower (Eocene) part of the formation represents a woodlanded ecosystem of which much petrified wood also remains. In contrast, the upper (Oligocene) layers present indication of much drier and cooler conditions, with savanna replacing the woodland for several million years before the climate turned wetter and warmer again and the forests regrew.

The fauna changes also notably during this time, seemingly coincident with the Eocene–Oligocene extinction event recorded in Eurasia.

Fossils

Mammals
 Arsinoitherium zitteli, an arsinoitheriid
 Bothriogenys fraasi, an anthracotheriid
 Herodotius pattersoni, a pseudoungulate
 Plesiopithecus, an enigmatic lemur-like primate
 Pliohyracidae, large hyraxes
 Ptolemaiida, carnivorous afrothere mammals
 Qatranilestes and Widanelfarasia, relatives of golden moles,  otter shrews, and tenrecs
 Several hyaenodontids (Akhnatenavus cf. leptognathus, Metapterodon)
 Several hystricognath rodents (e.g. Acritophiomys bowni, A. woodi, Elwynomys lavocati, Gaudeamus hylaeus)
 A primitive marsupial, maybe related to Peratherium
 Primitive Old World monkeys (e.g. Aegyptopithecus zeuxis, Biretia fayumensis & B. megalopsis)

Birds
 Eremopezus, an enigmatic large groundbird
 Goliathia, a large shoebill relative
 Palaeoephippiorhynchus dietrichi, a large stork
 Xenerodiops, an unusual heron
 A cormorant-like bird, possibly related to genus Piscator
 Several jacanas
 One or two species of primitive osprey and another bird of prey (possibly an ancestral sea eagle)
 A turaco

Other animals
 Albertwoodemys, a side-necked turtle
 "Crocodylus" megarhinus, an ancestral crocodile
 Eogavialis africanum, a primitive gharial
 Parachanna fayumensis, a snakehead fish
 Pterosphenus, a snake
 African tetras (Alestidae) or similar Characiformes
 Catfish, perhaps of genus Fajumia

See also 
 
 List of fossil sites

References

  (1993); Wildlife of Gondwana. Reed. 

Geologic formations of Egypt
Eocene Africa
Oligocene Africa
Faiyum Governorate
Geology of Egypt
Paleontology in Egypt
Eocene Series of Africa
Oligocene Series of Africa